Mimothestus is a genus of longhorn beetles of the subfamily Lamiinae, containing the following species:

 Mimothestus annulicornis Pic, 1935
 Mimothestus atricornis Pu, 1999

References

Lamiini